The Golden Jubilee Medal is awarded by the President of Uganda in recognition of outstanding service and loyalty to Uganda. Honorees are selected by the Presidential Awards Committee, which is responsible for identifying, selecting, vetting and forwarding nominated persons to the President for conferment of the Honors. The awards committee is headed by a Chancellor.

2022 Golden Jubilee Awardees 
The 2022 awards were conferred on 26 January, 2022.

References 

Ugandan awards